Jesús G. "Chuy" García (born April 12, 1956) is an American politician serving as the U.S. representative for Illinois's 4th district since 2019. A member of the Democratic Party, he served on the Cook County Board of Commissioners, as well as in the Illinois Senate and on the Chicago City Council before his election to Congress. He was also a candidate for mayor of Chicago in 2015 and 2023. Throughout his career in Chicago and national politics, he has been described as a progressive.

García was first elected to the Chicago City Council in 1986. During his time on the city council, he was known for being a staunch ally of Mayor Harold Washington. In 1992, he became the first Mexican-American member of the Illinois State Senate. He was defeated in his reelection bid to the state senate by Antonio Munoz in the 1998 primary.

In 2010, García was elected to the 7th district of the Cook County Board of Commissioners, and after his election was appointed floor leader by Cook County President Toni Preckwinkle. A candidate for mayor of Chicago in the 2015 election, he finished second in the February 24 general election and forced a runoff election against the incumbent, Rahm Emanuel, which Emanuel won. García won a seat in the U.S. House of Representatives in the 2018 election, replacing retiring Representative and ally Luis Gutiérrez.

He ran unsuccessfully for mayor of Chicago a second time in the 2023 election, challenging incumbent mayor Lori Lightfoot. After placing fourth in the first round, García endorsed Brandon Johnson's candidacy in the runoff.

Early life and education
García was born in Mexico in the state of Durango. His father was a farm laborer under the U.S. government's World War II-era bracero program.

García moved to the U.S. in 1965 with permanent resident status. The family settled in the Little Village neighborhood of Chicago, Illinois, where García continues to reside. He attended St. Rita High School, graduating in 1974. García became a citizen of the United States in 1977.

García worked at the Legal Assistance Foundation from 1977 to 1980 as he worked toward a B.A. in political science at the University of Illinois at Chicago. He then became assistant director of the Little Village Neighborhood Housing Service, where he worked until 1984. García also has a master's degree from University of Illinois at Chicago in urban public planning and policy.

Early political career

Chicago City Council
In 1983, García was the campaign manager for labor organizer Rudy Lozano, who challenged longtime alderman Frank Stemberk of the 22nd Ward. In the February 1983 election, Lozano came 17 votes short of forcing a runoff, which his supporters contended was due to voters with Spanish surnames being purged from the rolls. Lozano was murdered in June 1983, shot to death in his home. A reputed gang member was convicted of Lozano's murder, but his supporters still contend that he was killed for his labor and political activities. In 1984, García challenged Stemberk for committeeman in the Cook County Democratic Party. Lozano's supporters rallied around him and he was endorsed by Mayor Harold Washington. Stemberk was a supporter of alderman Edward Vrdolyak of the 10th Ward, who controlled the city council and opposed Washington's administration. The Chicago media dubbed this divide within city government the "Council Wars". With Lozano supporters taking to the race with a "religious fervor" and Washington campaigning heavily on García's behalf, he defeated Stemberk by 2,811 votes (40.62%) to 2,752 (39.77%), with activist and former labor union leader August Sallas taking 1,357 (19.61%). Unlike other committeemen and women, García used his office to provide constituent services, which helped him maintain his high profile. Washington also appointed him Deputy Commissioner of the Department of Water, a post he held from 1984 to 1986.

Meanwhile, Washington's allies had sued the city in federal court, claiming that the ward map drawn up after the 1980 Census had unfairly dispersed black and Hispanic voters. At that time, whites were about 40% of the city's population, blacks were also about 40%, and Hispanics were about 15%, but there were 33 white aldermen, only 16 black and just one Hispanic. In December 1985, as a result of a November 1985 ward remap, judge Charles Ronald Norgle Sr. of the United States District Court for the Northern District of Illinois ordered a special election for March 18, 1986, in seven wards, including the 22nd. The special elections gave Washington the opportunity to wrest control of the city council from Vrdolyak. Stemberk chose not to run for reelection and García declared his candidacy. In the nonpartisan election, García faced supermarket owner and Stemberk ally Guadalupe Martinez and beauty supply store owner Fred Yanez. Yanez emphasised his military service and Martinez called García "100 percent Communist" and criticized him for selling garbage cans, which Martinez gave away for free. García won by 3,293 votes (54.58%) to Martinez's 2,013 (33.37%) and Yanez's 727 (12.05%), carrying 26 of the 27 precincts. He was also reelected committeeman with 53.98% of the vote, carrying 24 of the 27 precincts. His election and the victory of two other Washington supporters meant that Vrdolyak's supporters had a one-seat majority. Six weeks later, Washington ally Luis Gutiérrez won a runoff in the 26th Ward and the council was thus evenly split between Washington and Vrdolyak supporters. As Washington had the ability to cast tie-breaking votes, Vrdolyak was stripped of his powers and the Council Wars ended. García was reelected with 3,998 votes (53.59%) in 1987 and with 2,707 votes (52.36%) in 1991. On the council, he served on the Budget and Government Operations; Committees, Rules, Municipal Code Revision and Ethics; Economic Development; Education; Finance; License; Ports, Wharves, and Bridges; Streets and Alleys; Traffic Control and Safety committees and chaired the Aviation committee.

Illinois Senate

Democratic State Senator Howard W. "Howie" Carroll of the 1st district of the Illinois Senate was redistricted to the 8th district, and in 1992 García ran for the Illinois Senate in the 1st district, winning the open-seat Democratic primary with 8,604 votes (52.06%) to Donald C. Smith's 6,159 (37.26%) and Gilbert G. Jimenez's 1,765 (10.68%). The primary was tantamount to election in the heavily Democratic 1st district, and in the general election, and García defeated Republican nominee Esequiel "Zeke" Iracheta, 21,314 votes (81.74%) to 4,762 (18.26%). He was Illinois's first state senator of Mexican descent. García resigned from the city council and was succeeded by his protégé Ricardo Muñoz.

In the 1996 Democratic primary, García was challenged by Alderman Juan Soliz of the 25th Ward. Soliz, who had also been elected in the March 1986 special elections, had been supported by Vrdolyak, earning him Chicago Hispanics' ire. When Soliz was elected, he called for unity among Hispanic aldermen, a plea they ignored. Soliz and García even celebrated their inaugurations by hiring separate mariachi bands to play outside the council chambers. After Soliz was replaced as chair of the Aviation Committee by García, he derided it as a "racist move", though they were both Mexican-Americans. García defeated Soliz, 6,839 votes (59.34%) to 4,686 (40.66%) and was reelected unopposed in the general election. In office, García helped shepherd "immigrant-friendly" health care and education reforms through the legislature. He lost the 1998 Democratic primary election by Antonio Munoz, who was backed by the Hispanic Democratic Organization, Mayor Richard M. Daley's campaign group and political machine. Munoz defeated García by 6,924 votes (53.72%) to 5,964 (46.28%). Alderman Ricardo Muñoz (no relation to Antonio Munoz), talking in 2010 about his mentor's defeat, said: "Part of the rationale that I think Chuy lost in '98 was that we got sloppy and they [Munoz and the HDO] got lucky. It rained all day, and we didn't have raincoats for our guys until 11 o'clock. By that time, they were frozen stiff. So we lost the field game."

Political interregnum
After his defeat, García left office in January 1999, founded and became Executive Director of the Little Village Community Development Corporation. He helped grow what is now known as Enlace to 27 full-time employees, 120 part-time employees, and an annual budget of $5 million. In June 2005, he helped found the Latino Action Research Network, a PAC to help better represent the city's Latino population.

On Mother's Day 2001, García and members of the group demanded the construction of a high school promised to the community, but unfunded. Fourteen parents and grandparents organized a hunger strike. Chicago Public Schools CEO Paul Vallas initially refused to meet with the hunger strikers, but by the end of the first week, he visited their tent to negotiate terms. The hunger strike lasted 19 days and increased public pressure on the school district to fund the project. In August 2001, the newly appointed Chicago Public Schools CEO, Arne Duncan, reallocated funds to begin construction on the school. Community members continued to advocate for participation in designing the new school, and door-to-door parent surveys contributed to the curricular focus of each school on the campus.

Cook County Board of Commissioners
In 2010, García ran for the Cook County Board of Commissioners, challenging 7th district member and HDO candidate Joseph Mario Moreno in the Democratic primary. García defeated him, 9,602 votes (54.74%) to 7,939 (45.26%). In the general election, he defeated Green Party nominee Paloma M. Andrade, 24,612 votes (86.29%) to 3,912 (13.72%). After the election, Toni Preckwinkle appointed García Floor Leader. He was reelected unopposed to a second term on the Board of Commissioners in the 2014 elections.

2015 mayoral campaign

García entered the mayoral race against incumbent mayor Rahm Emanuel after being recruited by Chicago Teachers Union President Karen Lewis, a leading progressive candidate who had fallen ill and was forced to call off her own campaign. García won 34% of the vote in the February 24 primary, and Emanuel failed to win more than 50%, forcing a runoff election on April 7. The campaign received national attention, and some considered it a preview of the 2016 Democratic presidential primary. Senator Bernie Sanders endorsed García in what he called a "political revolution in Chicago." García opposed the Ashland Bus Rapid Transit plan, the Belmont flyover, and red light cameras. Emanuel won the runoff election with 55% of the vote.

Post-mayoral election

García endorsed Bernie Sanders for President of the United States in the 2016 election and the 2020 election. In the 2016 general election, García was a presidential elector from Illinois, casting a vote for Democratic nominees Hillary Clinton and Tim Kaine in the electoral college.

After incumbent and formal rival Rahm Emanuel announced that he would not seek a third term in 2019, many people speculated that a high-ranking Latino politician would enter the race. Gutiérrez and García were seen as potential candidates. After Gutiérrez declined to run, he expressed his intent to draft García into the race. Sanders expressed his desire for García to "take a look for running for mayor." García ultimately did not run.

In the 2019 mayoral runoff election, García endorsed Lori Lightfoot, delivering a blow to the already faltering campaign of Lightfoot's opponent, Toni Preckwinkle. Preckwinkle, who had been García's ally on the Cook County Board of Commissioners, had declined to endorse him for mayor in 2015. Lightfoot defeated Preckwinkle in a landslide.

U.S. House of Representatives

While in congress, García has become an important power broker in Illinois politics. He was an ally of then-Illinois House Speaker Michael Madigan. García first aligned himself with Madigan years earlier, when he supported Madigan's contested 2016 reelection. In July 2023, a staffer of his published a now deleted tweet on his government account calling a critic "borderline retarded" and a "f–ing dipshit".

Elections

2018 

On November 27, 2017, six days before the deadline to file petitions to run in the 2018 election, Congressman Luis Gutiérrez pulled his petition, effectively choosing to retire at the conclusion of his 13th term. The next day, García signaled his intention to run for the open seat. During Gutiérrez's press conference, he endorsed García as his successor. Bernie Sanders also endorsed García. Politico called Gutiérrez's sudden retirement "totally abnormal" and his endorsement of García a "coronation", as the district is so heavily Democratic that the primary is the real contest and the general election is effectively a formality.

García won the Democratic nomination in March 2018 with 60% of the primary vote. He defeated financial adviser Mark Wayne Lorch in the November 6 general election with 86% of the vote.

2020 

García ran for reelection in 2020 and was unopposed in the primary. Christopher Lasky was the only Republican to file before the filing deadline. Lasky died on December 23, 2019, but remained the only candidate on the primary ballot and won posthumously. After the primary, party leaders chose local political activist Jesus Solorio as the new Republican nominee. García won the general election with nearly 85% of the vote.

2022 

García was reelected to a third term, defeating Republican nominee James Falakos and Working Class Party nominee Edward Hershey.

Tenure

Immigration 

During a congressional hearing in July 2019, García asked former ICE Acting Director Thomas Homan of the Trump administration family separation policy: "how [he] can possibly allow this to happen under [his] watch, [does he] not care? Is it because these children do not look like children that are around [him]?" Right-wing commentators widely condemned García's questions; Homan called them "disgusting".

On December 10, 2019, García introduced the New Way Forward Act, an immigration reform bill.

Foreign policy 
In July 2019, García voted against a House resolution condemning the Global Boycott, Divestment, and Sanctions Movement targeting Israel. The resolution passed 398-17.

In 2021, García was one of eight Democrats to vote against the funding of Israel's Iron Dome missile defense system.

In 2023, Garcia was among 56 Democrats to vote in favor of H.Con.Res. 21, which directed President Joe Biden to remove U.S. troops from Syria within 180 days.

Committee assignments 

 Committee on Financial Services
 Subcommittee on National Security, International Development and Monetary Policy
 Subcommittee on Oversight and Investigations
 Committee on Natural Resources
 Subcommittee on Indigenous Peoples of the United States
 Subcommittee on Oversight and Investigations
 Committee on Transportation and Infrastructure
 Subcommittee on Highways and Transit
 Subcommittee on Railroads, Pipelines, and Hazardous Materials

Caucus memberships 

 Congressional Hispanic Caucus
 Congressional LGBT Equality Caucus
 Congressional Progressive Caucus

2023 mayoral campaign

Early in 2022, García had been seen as a potential candidate to challenge Mayor Lori Lightfoot in the 2023 election. He had previously said that Lightfoot was "fac[ing] the toughest reelection challenge of any mayor in 40 years".

Before entering the race, García expressed interest in it because of Lightfoot's unpopularity and a poll that showed him leading Lightfoot 43% to 34%. On November 10, 2022, García announced his second campaign for mayor of Chicago in a press conference at Navy Pier. The date of his announcement was the 40th anniversary of García's mentor and ally Harold Washington's announcement of his 1983 mayoral candidacy. García's announcement came only two days after the 2022 U.S. House of Representatives election in which he was reelected. Lightfoot criticized García for "abandoning Congress" when the Democratic Party was losing its majority in the House. 

García was late to enter the mayoral race, the last of Lightfoot's eight challengers to announce his campaign. By the time he announced his candidacy, a number of groups that had supported his 2015 campaign, such as the Chicago Teachers Union and United Working Families, had pledged their support to Brandon Johnson's candidacy. In the months before García launched his campaign, such groups had grown impatient with his lack of a campaign announcement. García asked United Working Families to postpone making a mayoral endorsement, but due to his refusal to give them a date by which he planned to announce whether he would run, they endorsed Johnson in September 2022.

García was endorsed by former Illinois Governor Pat Quinn, former Chicago mayor and Harold Washington's vice mayor David Orr, former U.S. Representative Luis Gutiérrez, U.S. Representatives Jan Schakowsky and Mike Quigley, Aldermen Andre Vasquez, Michael Rodriguez, and Felix Cardona Jr., Illinois state representatives Theresa Mah and Robyn Gabel, activist Dolores Huerta, United Farm Workers, and International Union of Operating Engineers Local 150.

García was the only Latino candidate in the election. Along with Paul Vallas, who is white, García was one of only two candidates on the ballot who was not black.

García faced controversy over political donations he received from Sam Bankman-Fried and stories that allege links to illicit activities by Michael Madigan involving Commonwealth Edison. Lightfoot seized on this and ran ads against him focusing on these controversies. 

As Vallas began to rise in the polls, Garcia joined Lightfoot in attacking Vallas as aligned with the Republican Party. This included accusing Vallas of being inadequately pro-choice, despite Vallas's record of claiming to be pro-choice and endorsements from Planned Parenthood and Personal PAC during his 2002 gubernatorial and 2014 lieutenant gubernatorial campaigns. Both García and Lightfoot pointed to a 2009 interview in which Vallas declared himself to be "more of a Republican than a Democrat because, fundamentally, I oppose abortion" and said that "if I were to run for office again, I would run as a Republican". But Vallas also described himself in that interview as "personally pro-choice". Another line of attack García and Lightfoot used against Vallas was criticism of his relationship with and endorsement by Chicago's police union. García cast Vallas's closeness to the FOP as indicating that there would be "no police accountability" under a Vallas mayoralty. García also derided the police union as "far right".

García also traded barbs with Brandon Johnson. Johnson said García had "abandon[ed] the progressive movement” and was no different from Lightfoot in his proposals for combating violent crime. He also said García had been absent from work on a number of issues that impacted Latino neighborhoods in the city. García characterized Johnson's tax proposals as incomplete and outside of a mayor's ability to enact. He questioned whether Johnson, a former organizer for the Chicago Teachers Union, would be able to objectively negotiate with them on behalf of the city.

Despite having once been a formidable front-runner in the election, García was defeated in the first round of the election. He placed fourth out of nine candidates, receiving roughly 70,600 votes (9.57% of the election's overall vote). Vallas and Johnson placed first and second, respectively, and advanced to the runoff.

García placed first in only six of the city's 50 wards. All six were wards represented by Latino aldermen. In five of them, the runner-up was Vallas. One factor in García's weak performance was that turnout in Latino-majority wards of the city, voter turnout lagged behind the rest of the city. Turnout in Hispanic wards had also been low in the 2019 Chicago mayoral election. Additionally, García failed to place first in four Northwest-side Latino-majority wards in areas of the city that had given him strong support in his previous mayoral campaign, with Johnson placing first in two of those wards and Vallas placing first in the other two. García also lagged behind Johnson in other areas of the city that had supported him in 2015. On March 17, García endorsed Johnson's candidacy in the runoff election.

Electoral history

Illinois State Senate

Cook County Board of Commissioners

U.S. House of Representatives

Mayor of Chicago

Personal life

García married Evelyn García in 1980 and they have three children. They live in the Little Village neighborhood in South Lawndale, Chicago.

See also

List of Hispanic and Latino Americans in the United States Congress
 Mexicans in Chicago

References

Further reading
 Detailed article on García's 1998 primary defeat

External links

 Congressman Jesús "Chuy" García official U.S. House website
 Campaign website
 

|-

1956 births
20th-century American politicians
21st-century American politicians
2016 United States presidential electors
American politicians of Mexican descent
Candidates in the 2015 United States elections
Chicago City Council members
Democratic Party members of the United States House of Representatives from Illinois
Hispanic and Latino American city council members
Hispanic and Latino American members of the United States Congress
Hispanic and Latino American state legislators in Illinois
Democratic Party Illinois state senators
Living people
Mexican emigrants to the United States
Politicians from Durango
University of Illinois Chicago alumni
Candidates in the 2023 United States elections